Stephan Hegyi (born 25 July 1998) is an Austrian judoka.

Hegyi began his career at Budoclub Wien. He followed Peter Seisenbacher to Hakoah Vienna, who was hired as a coach in 2014. He is currently the club's most successful judoka.

In 2017, he competed in the men's +100 kg and men's team events at the European Judo Championships held in Warsaw, Poland. In that same year, he also competed in the men's +100 kg event at the 2017 World Judo Championships held in Budapest, Hungary. In 2018, he won the silver medal in the men's +100 kg event at the European U23 Judo Championships held in Győr, Hungary.

In 2020, he lost his bronze medal match in the men's +100 kg event at the European Judo Championships held in Prague, Czech Republic. In 2021, he competed in the men's +100 kg event at the Judo World Masters held in Doha, Qatar. He also competed in the men's +100 kg event at the 2021 World Judo Championships in Budapest, Hungary where he was eliminated in his second match by Iakiv Khammo of Ukraine.

In 2021, Hegyi competed in the men's +100 kg event at the 2020 Summer Olympics held in Tokyo, Japan where he was eliminated in his first match by eventual bronze medalist Teddy Riner of France.

He won one of the bronze medals in his event at the 2022 Judo Grand Slam Tel Aviv held in Tel Aviv, Israel.

References

External links

 
 

Living people
1998 births
Sportspeople from Vienna
Austrian male judoka
European Games competitors for Austria
Judoka at the 2019 European Games
European Games medalists in judo
European Games bronze medalists for Austria
Judoka at the 2020 Summer Olympics
Olympic judoka of Austria
21st-century Austrian people